Andrew Neil Porter (12 October 1945 – 4 March 2021) was Rhodes Professor of Imperial History at King's College London from 1993 to 2008. Between 1979 and 1990, he edited the Journal of Imperial and Commonwealth History. He was educated at Christ's Hospital and St John's College, Cambridge (MA, PhD).

Selected publications
Books
The Origins of the South African War: Joseph Chamberlain and the diplomacy of imperialism, 1895‑99. St. Martin's, New York, 1980.
Victorian shipping, business and imperial policy: Donald Currie, the Castle Line, and southern Africa. Boydell & Brewer, Woodbridge, 1986. 
European Imperialism, 1860-1914. Palgrave, 1994.
The Oxford history of the British Empire: Vol. III The nineteenth century, Oxford University Press, Oxford, 1999. (Editor)
Religion versus empire? British protestant missionaries and overseas expansion, 1700-1914. Manchester University Press, Manchester, 2004. 
Articles
"The South African war and the historians" in African Affairs, Vol. 99, No. 397 (Oct., 2000), pp. 633–648.

References

External links
Andrew Porter on Britain's Empire in 1815.

1945 births
2021 deaths
People educated at Christ's Hospital
Alumni of St John's College, Cambridge
Academics of King's College London
British historians
Fellows of King's College London